The 2010–11 Evansville Purple Aces men's basketball team represented the University of Evansville in the 2010–11 NCAA Division I men's basketball season. The Purple Aces, led by head coach Marty Simmons, played their home games at Roberts Municipal Stadium in Evansville, Indiana, as members of the Missouri Valley Conference. The Purple Aces finished sixth in the Missouri Valley during the regular season, and were eliminated in the quarterfinals of the Missouri Valley tournament by eventual tournament champion Indiana State.

Evansville failed to qualify for the NCAA tournament, but were invited to the 2011 College Basketball Invitational. The Purple Aces defeated Hofstra in the first round of the CBI for the program's first postseason victory since the 1989 NCAA tournament. Evansville were eliminated in the quarterfinals of the CBI, losing to Boise State, 75–69.

This was Evansville's last season playing at Roberts Stadium; for the 2011–12 season, the Purple Aces moved to the new downtown Ford Center.

Roster 

Source

Schedule and results

|-
!colspan=9 style=|Exhibition

|-
!colspan=9 style=|Regular season

|-
!colspan=9 style=| Missouri Valley tournament

|-
!colspan=9 style=| CBI

Source

References

Evansville Purple Aces men's basketball seasons
Evansville
Evansville
Evansville men's basketball
Evansville men's basketball